Inga sinacae is a species of plant in the family Fabaceae. It is endemic to Veracruz state in eastern  Mexico.

References

sinacae
Endemic flora of Mexico
Flora of Veracruz
Endangered plants
Endangered biota of Mexico
Taxonomy articles created by Polbot